Brooklyn has been the name of several American ships.

Brooklyn, a ship taken to San Francisco by Mormon pioneers. See also Voyage of the Brooklyn Saints.

Three ships of the United States Navy have borne the name Brooklyn, after the New York City borough of Brooklyn. 
 The , was a wooden screw sloop commissioned in 1859 and a participant in the American Civil War.
 The , was a cruiser commissioned in 1896 and a flagship in the Spanish–American War.
 The , was a light cruiser commissioned in 1937 that saw service in World War II and was later transferred to Chile.